This is a list of fossiliferous stratigraphic units in Western Sahara.



See also 
 Lists of fossiliferous stratigraphic units in Africa
 List of fossiliferous stratigraphic units in Mauritania

References

Further reading 
 S. Adnet, H. Cappetta, and R. Tabuce. 2010. A Middle–Late Eocene vertebrate fauna (marine fish and mammals) from southwestern Morocco; preliminary report: age and palaeobiogeographical implications. Geological Magazine 147(6):860-870
 C.h. J. Burton and N. Eldredge. 1974. Two new subspecies of Phacops rana (Trilobita) from the middle Devonian of north-west Africa. Palaeontology 17(2):349-363
 P. D. Gingerich and S. Zouhri. 2015. New fauna of archaeocete whales (Mammalia, Cetacea) from the Bartonian middle Eocene of southern Morocco. Journal of African Earth Sciences 111:273-286
 A. L. Rode and B. S. Lieberman. 2004. Using GIS to unlock the interactions between biogeography, environment, and evolution in middle and Late Devonian brachiopods and bivalves. Palaeogeography, Palaeoclimatology, Palaeoecology 211(3-4):345-359
 S. Zouhri, P. D. Gingerich, N. Elboudali, S. Sebti, A., Noubhani, M. Rahali and S. Meslouh. 2014. New marine mammal faunas (Cetacea and Sirenia) and sea level change in the Samlat Formation, Upper Eocene, near Ad-Dakhla in southwestern Morocco. Comptes Rendus Palevol

List
List
Western Sahara
Western Sahara
Fossiliferous stratigraphic units